The National Council of Provinces (NCOP) is the upper house of the Parliament of South Africa under the (post-apartheid) constitution which came into full effect in 1997. It replaced the former Senate, but is very similar to that body, and to many other upper houses of legislatures throughout the world, in that its purpose is to represent the governments of the provinces, rather than directly representing the people.

Composition

The NCOP consists of ninety delegates, ten delegates for each of the nine provinces regardless of the population of the province. Each province is equally represented in the NCOP.

A provincial delegation is composed of six permanent delegates and four special delegates. The party representation in the delegation must proportionally reflect the party representation in the provincial legislature, based on a formula included in the Constitution.

The permanent delegates are selected by the nine provincial legislatures. The four special delegates include the Premier of the province and three other delegates. They are nominated by each province from the members of the provincial legislature and are contingent on the subject matter being considered by the NCOP. The premier leads the province's delegation in the NCOP, but they can choose any of the others delegates to head of the delegation in their absence.

The South African Local Government Association is also part of the NCOP. SALGA has 10 delegates who may partake in the debates and other activities, but they do not vote.

Current composition
After the elections of 8 May 2019, the new provincial legislatures met on 22 May to elect NCOP delegations. The delegations elected are described in the following table.

Role in the legislative process

The NCOP may consider, amend, propose amendments to, or reject the legislation. It must consider all national bills, and also has the power to initiate legislation in the functional areas where Parliament and the provincial legislatures have concurrent legislative power.

The NCOP has four decision-making mechanisms depending on the type of bill:
Section 74 bills; they may not deal with any matters other than constitutional amendments and matters related to the amendments. A bill that amends section 1 of the constitution (which defines South Africa as a constitutional democratic republic), or amends the Bill of Rights, or amends any constitutional provision affecting the NCOP itself, provincial boundaries or powers, or other specifically provincial matters, must be passed by the NCOP. Each delegation has one vote, and six of the nine delegations must approve the bill for it to pass. Other constitutional amendments do not have to be passed by the NCOP, but they must be debated publicly in the NCOP.
Section 75 Bills; These bills are managed with regard to the process specified in section 75 of the Constitution. When voting on these Bills, delegates vote individually. The Bill is approved when a simple majority of delegates vote for the Bill.
Section 76 Bills; Bills that concern the provinces are mainly those that correlate with areas of combined national and provincial legislative powers. These Bills are dealt with in the provision of the procedure in section 76 of the Constitution. When voting on these bills, the nine provincial delegations vote in line with the instruction communicated to them by their respective provincial legislatures. Each delegation has one vote. The Bill is approved if a majority of delegations vote for the Bill.
 Section 77 Bills; These are Bills which cover the appropriation of money, the enactment of national taxes, levies, duties or surcharges. They are handled with reference to the process delineated in section 77 of the Constitution. Delegates vote individually. The Bill is accepted when the majority of delegates vote to approve it.

Office bearers

Chairperson and deputy chairperson
The office of President of the Senate was succeeded by the office of chairperson of the National Council of Provinces in 1997. The inaugural holder of the position was Mosiuoa Lekota. He served as chairperson from 1997 to 1999. The chairperson is elected from the permanent delegates for a five-year term. The election of the chairperson is presided over by the Chief Justice of South Africa. The Chief Justice can, however, designate another judge to preside. The chairperson, in turn, presides over the other elections that takes place in the chamber. The legislative also elects a permanent deputy chairperson. A second deputy chairperson is elected for a one-year term. The position rotates between the nine provinces, enabling the provinces to have its members elected second deputy chairperson,

The chairperson chairs all the sittings of the National Council of the Provinces. If the chairperson is not present at the sittings, the deputy chairperson or  House Chairpersons can preside over the sitting of the chamber.

The current chairperson is Amos Masondo after having taken office on 23 May 2019. The current deputy chairperson is Sylvia Lucas. The following people have served as chairperson of the NCOP:

Chairperson of the Committees
The chairperson of the committees is appointed by the members of the legislature. The position holds the following roles, including presiding over the meeting of the committee of chairpersons, approve the budget and expenditures of the committees and to preside over sittings of the House, when the chairperson and deputy chairperson are not available.

Chief Whips and Party Whips
Whips represent their individual parties' interests and ensure the discipline of their members. They also ensure that their parties function effectively. There are two Chief Whips who are official office bearers, the Chief Whip of the majority party and the Chief Whip of the largest opposition party. The smaller parties have Senior Whips assisted by a number of whips. The Chief Whips are formally appointed by the chairperson.  The Chief Whip of the majority party is responsible for the detailed arrangement of the legislative business.

Leader of the Opposition
The position is designated to the leader of the largest opposition party in the legislature. Cathlene Labuschagne of the Democratic Alliance has been serving as Leader of the Opposition since her election in September 2016.

See also
 Provincial legislature (South Africa)
 List of National Council of Provinces members of the 27th Parliament of South Africa
 Federalism
 National Assembly of South Africa

References

External links
 Parliament of South Africa: National Council of Provinces

1997 establishments in South Africa
South Africa
Parliament of South Africa